This is a list of Members of Parliament (MPs) elected to the Parliament of Ghana for the Third Parliament of the Fourth Republic of Ghana at the 2000 parliamentary election, held on 7 December 2000.

The list is arranged by region and constituency. New MPs elected since the general election and changes in party allegiance are noted at the bottom of the page.

Composition after election

List of MPs elected in the general election
The following table is a list of MPs elected on 7 December 2000, ordered by region and constituency. The previous MP and previous party column shows the MP and party holding the seat.



Postponed poll
 - Asutifi South constituency - 3 January 2001 - Due to the death of Philip Kofi Adjapong Amoah, (NPP) candidate standing for parliament, the elections in this constituency were postponed. Cecilia Djan Amoah, the (NPP) replacement candidate and also the widow of the deceased, won the seat with a majority of 550.

By-elections
 - Bimbilla constituency - 14 March 2002 - Dominic Aduna Bingab Nitiwul (NPP) won with a majority of 7621, after Mohamed Ibn Chambas had vacated the seat to take up his new job as the Executive Secretary of the Economic Community of West African States.
 - Wulensi constituency  - 4 March 2003 - Kofi Karim Wumbei (NPP), a teacher, won with a majority of 894 following the disqualification of the incumbent MP, Samuel Nyimakan of the NDC by the Supreme Court of Ghana on 15 January 2003.
 - Navrongo Central constituency - 25 March 2003 - Joseph Kofi Adda (NPP) won with a majority of 7271, following the death of John Setuni Achuliwor (NPP)  who died on 29 January 2003 after a road traffic accident on [5 January 2003.
 - Gomoa East constituency - 8 April 2003 -  Richmond Sam Quarm (NPP) won with a majority of 6,024 following the death of Emmanuel Acheampong (NPP) in a road traffic accident on February 9, 2003.
 - Amenfi West constituency - 24 April 2003 -  Mrs Agnes Sonful (NPP), teacher, 52, won with a majority of 4,121 due to the resignation of Abraham Kofi Asante on 26 March 2003.
 - Upper Denkyira constituency - 29 June 2004 - Benjamin Kofi Ayeh (NPP) won from a field of three candidates with a majority of 20,899.

Notes
 - Okere constituency: The smallest winning majority in the election was just 9 votes. Brandford Kwame Daniel Adu of the NPP had 7,322 votes while Fuzzy Torbay of the NDC had 7,313 votes.
 - Bantama constituency: Richard  Anane of NPP won the seat by 88,649 votes to 10,679 votes for Stephen K. Boateng of the NDC. This gave him the largest majority in this election, 77,970.

References

See also
2000 Ghanaian parliamentary election
Parliament of Ghana
Peter Ala Adjetey - Speaker of the Third Parliament

External links and sources
Election Passport:Ghana - Data
Ghana election results
Electoral Commission of Ghana-  Parliamentary Result - Election 2000 archived from the original (Electoral Commission of Ghana)

MP
2000